Jader Fontenelle Barbalho Filho (born June 24, 1976) is a Brazilian public official affiliated with the Brazilian Democratic Movement (MDB) party. Since 2023, he has served as Minister of Cities in the cabinet of President Luiz Inácio Lula da Silva.

Biography 
Jader Barbalho Filho was born in Belém, Pará. His father, Jader Barbalho, served as Governor of Pará, and his mother, Elcione Zahluth Barbalho, served as a member of the Chamber of Deputies. His brother Helder Barbalho has served as Governor of Pará since 2019.

During the 2022 Brazilian general election, he was considered part of the 'Lulist' wing of the MDB. Following Lula's election, he was chosen for the position of Minister of Cities. He has stated that rebuilding the  public housing program will be a top priority of his leadership.

References 

Brazilian politicians
1976 births
Brazilian Democratic Movement politicians
Living people
People from Belém
Government ministers of Brazil